Co-Ed Prison Sluts is a musical revue that originally opened at the Annoyance Theatre in April 1989, closed in June 2000, and reopened in 2008, making it the longest-running musical in Chicago, Illinois, a title that still holds to this day.

The show was directed by Mick Napier with original music by Faith Soloway. The show is known for having been an important part of the Chicago fringe theater.

Plot 
Co-Ed Prison Sluts follows the prison's newest inmate, Alice, as she learns the ropes from the other inane inmates including Hamster Man, The Dame, Skeeter, Slick, Henry, and Dr. Bellows and his dog Fluffy. And she learns the number one rule — to fear the dreaded Clown.

Thanks to songs such as "Hey We're in Prison" and "The Dog is Eating my Hamster Now", Co-ed Prison Sluts is known for its risqué themes, and has helped forged The Annoyance's tradition of raunchy, edgy comedy.

Return 
In 2008, the flagship show for The Annoyance returned to its new stage, on 4830 N. Broadway, as the final event in the celebration of its 20th Anniversary. Due to sell out crowds, and positive reviews, the show has now been officially given an open run, continuing its tradition of the longest-running musical in Chicago.

Cast
The current cast includes:

Directed by Mick Napier
Original music by Faith Soloway
Musical Director: Lisa McQueen

Notes

1989 musicals
Theatre in Chicago